This page summarises the Australia national soccer team fixtures and results in 2005.

Summary

2005 saw the Australian national football team playing twelve senior matches in what proved to be a definitive season for the history of the men's senior national side. The games included participating in the 2005 FIFA Confederations Cup in Germany and a dramatic end to a 32-year absence from the FIFA World Cup by qualifying, via a penalty shoot-out for the 2006 FIFA World Cup.

After six years in charge of the Australian side, a disappointing 2005 FIFA Confederations Cup campaign saw coach Frank Farina replaced by the more experienced Dutchman Guus Hiddink, who was appointed to qualify Australia for the World Cup finals, and take them through that campaign should they succeed.

Record

Match results

Friendlies

Confederations Cup

World Cup qualifiers

The aggregate score for the two legs against Uruguay was tied 1–1 and, since the away goals rule could not be applied, the play-off was decided on a penalty shoot-out. Australia qualified after winning 4–2.

Goal scorers

References

2005
2005 in Australian soccer
2005 national football team results